The Ellis & Burnand Tramway was from 1922 to 1958 a  long bush tramway near Ongarue in the central North Island of New Zealand with a gauge of .

Route 
The construction of the rail track started in 1922, after J. W. Ellis and Harry Burnand had built their timber mill at Ongarue in 1914.

The Ellis & Burnand Tramway was well engineered with a spiral, a tunnel, two great trestle bridges and very impressive cuttings.

In 1955 the tramway was closed because of flood damage, followed by the mill closure in 1966.

Locomotives 
Geared steam locomotives Climax, Heisler/Stearns and A & G Price were used on the tramway. The Climax operated between the mill and the Waione camp siding while the A & G Price ran from there to the bush loading points.

Timber trail 
The right of way of the tramway is now being used as the Timber Trail, which can be used on foot or bike.

See also 
 Rail trail

References

External links 

 Wheel5800: Ongarue - the Great Ellis & Burnand Tramway. 29 modern photos on Flickr.
 Wheel5800: Ellis & Burnand Siding & Tramway Ongarue. 9 modern photos on Flickr.

Logging railways in New Zealand
Rail transport in Manawatū-Whanganui
Railway companies of New Zealand
Ruapehu District